Catllar is a commune in the Pyrénées-Orientales department in southern France.

Geography

Localisation 
Catllar is located in the canton of Les Pyrénées catalanes and in the arrondissement of Prades.

Government and politics

Mayors

Population

See also
Communes of the Pyrénées-Orientales department

References

External links

 https://web.archive.org/web/20090107083434/http://www.mairiedecatllar.com/

Communes of Pyrénées-Orientales